Peter van Ooijen (born 16 February 1992) is a Dutch professional footballer who plays as a midfielder for Helmond Sport.

Career
Born in Rosmalen, Van Ooijen started his career with PSV, having joined the club in 2003 from FC Den Bosch. He made his professional debut in a 2012–13 UEFA Europa League game against FK Zeta and scored two goals in a 9–0 win.

On 9 June 2014, Van Ooijen signed a one-year deal with Go Ahead Eagles, leaving PSV as a free agent. After the relegation of Go Ahead Eagles, Van Ooijen left on a free transfer and signed a two-year deal with Heracles Almelo.

On 1 August 2020, Van Ooijen joined 3. Liga side KFC Uerdingen 05 on a free transfer from VVV-Venlo, having agreed a two-year contract.

On 23 June 2021, he returned to the Netherlands and signed a one-year contract with Emmen.

On 14 July 2022, van Ooijen joined Helmond Sport on a two-year contract.

References

External links
 

1992 births
Living people
People from Rosmalen
Association football midfielders
Dutch footballers
PSV Eindhoven players
Jong PSV players
Go Ahead Eagles players
Heracles Almelo players
VVV-Venlo players
KFC Uerdingen 05 players
FC Emmen players
Helmond Sport players
Eredivisie players
Eerste Divisie players
3. Liga players
Dutch expatriate footballers
Expatriate footballers in Germany
Dutch expatriate sportspeople in Germany
Footballers from North Brabant